Functional English is usage of the English language required to perform a specific function. This is typically taught as a foundation subject when a good command of English is required for academic study and career progression. In some cases, a particular form of technical English, such as Aviation English, may be required for a particular vocation. Such specialised usage is known and taught as English for Specific Purposes (ESP).

See also
English as a foreign or second language

References

English-language education